The 13th World Team Challenge 2014 (officially: R(H)EINPOWER-Biathlon-WTC 14) was a biathlon competition, that was held at December 27, 2014, at the Veltins-Arena in Gelsenkirchen, Germany. The winners were Valj Semerenko and Serhiy Semenov from Ukraine, and it was second victory for this country after Ukrainian team had won it in 2008.

Participants 
20 sportsmen (10 male, 10 female) competed as mixed teams. 9 different countries were represented at this event since host country was represented by two teams.

Results

External links 
 Official Webpage of the Event

World Team Challenge
2014 in biathlon
2014 in German sport
December 2014 sports events in Germany